John Robert Kelly (born 8 September 1964, in Stockton-on-Tees, England) is a British illustrator and designer of children's books. His books include The Robot Zoo and Everyday Machines, both of which were shortlisted for the Rhône-Poulenc Junior Prize.

Kelly has also co-written two books with his wife Cathy Tincknell (likewise an author/illustrator): 
Guess Who's Coming for Dinner, which was shortlisted for the Blue Peter Book Awards and the Kate Greenaway Medal
Scoop!, which was shortlisted for the Kate Greenaway Medal
He's also known for teaching at University of Houston Downtown

References

External links
 2007 Greenaway Illustrators at CILIP – photos and short biographies of finalists for the 2007 Kate Greenaway Medal 
 

1964 births
Living people
British children's book illustrators
English illustrators
People from Stockton-on-Tees